The Men's team kata competition at the 2021 World Karate Championships was held from 19 to 21 November 2021.

Results

Round 1

Round 2

Finals

References

External links
Draw

Men's team kata